The Turdetani were an ancient pre-Roman people of the Iberian Peninsula, living in the valley of the Guadalquivir (the river that the Turdetani called by two names: Kertis and Rérkēs (Ῥέρκης); Romans would call the river by the name Baetis), in what was to become the Roman Province of Hispania Baetica (modern south of Spain). Strabo considers them to have been the successors to the people of Tartessos and to have spoken a language closely related to the Tartessian language.

History
The Turdetani were in constant contact with their Greek and Carthaginian neighbors. Herodotus describes them as enjoying a civilized rule under a king, Arganthonios, who welcomed Phocaean colonists in the fifth century BC. The Turdetani are said to have possessed a written legal code and to have employed Iberian mercenaries to carry on their wars against Rome. Strabo notes that the Turdetani were the most civilized people in Iberia, with the implication that their ordered, urbanized culture was most in accord with Greco-Roman models. After the end of the Second Punic War, the Turdetani rose against their Roman governor in 197 BC. When Cato the Elder became consul in 195 BC, he was given the command of the whole of Hispania. Cato first put down the rebellion in the northeast, then marched south and put down the revolt by the Turdetani, "the least warlike of all the Hispanic tribes". Cato was able to return to Rome in 194, leaving two praetors in charge of the two provinces.

In Plautus' comedy The Captives, a reference to the Turdetani (Act i, Scene ii) amusingly purports to show that their district in Hispania Baetica had become proverbially famous for the thrushes and small birds supplied for Roman tables. Turdus is the genus of the thrushes.

See also
Carpia
Carissa
Southwest Paleohispanic script
Turduli

Notes

References
 Ángel Montenegro et alii, Historia de España 2 - colonizaciones y formación de los pueblos prerromanos (1200-218 a.C), Editorial Gredos, Madrid (1989)

External links

Detailed map of the Pre-Roman Peoples of Iberia (around 200 BC)
Livy, History of Rome book 34, especially 34.17 and following sections

Pre-Roman peoples of the Iberian Peninsula
Tartessos
Ancient peoples of Spain